Tatjana Barbakoff (August 15, 1899 – February 6, 1944) born as Cilly Edelsberg was a ballet and Chinese style dancer. She became a ballerina in Germany. After her death, Julia Tardi-Markus, in order to honor Barbakoff, initiated the "Tatjana Barbakoff Prize" in 1986 to help to encourage young dancers.

Early life
Tatjana Barbakoff was born as Cilly Edelsberg in Hasenpoth, Courland Governorate, at the time a province of the Russian Empire, today in Latvia. She was the daughter of Aizik, a Russian born butcher and Genya, who had been born in China. She changed her name to Tsipora. The parents had two daughters named Cilly and Fani.  Barbakoff had an older brother, and after the early death of his mother in 1903, her father remarried Haja-Sora Itskovitch, another stepsister in 1912. She attended ballet school up until ten years of age, but had no further dance training as a child.

Life
In 1918 she followed a German soldier, Georg Waldmann, who served in the Baltic states during World War I.  It was during his military service duty, according to Germany, where she married him later. With her husband, who performed under the pseudonym Marcel Boissier as a guest emcee, she has performed Russian and Chinese dances. In 1921, she created solo performances in larger houses at home and abroad, where the costumes were usually designed for her, and described as plastic picturesque costumes. Some Jewish women were considered as cabaret leaders during this time period.

Tatjana Barbakoff, of Russian-Jewish and Chinese heritage, was a cabaret icon and international dance sensation, known for her flamboyant costumes, legendary beauty, and sharp sense of humor.

Since 1924, it was previously known that she had included Chinese dances alongside Russian dances and parodies in their program. Because of her attractive charisma, she became a public magnet, and a magnet for many artists including Rudolf Heinisch and Kasia of Szadurska where they portrayed her in numerous photos, paintings and sculptures.  Barbakoff started more formal ballet training with the French ballerina Catherine Devilliers in 1927. Also in 1927, she separated from her husband. After an appearance in the hall Chopin Hall in Paris on May 9, 1933, she was able to leave with all her costumes, and leave Berlin to go to Paris.

Internment and death
With her partner, Gert Heinrich Wollheim who was a painter, she traveled from Saarbrücken to Paris. In France, the Netherlands and Switzerland held their own for a while. After the invasion of France by German troops, she was sent on 10 May 1940 to Camp de Gurs for internment. In June she was released again and moved to Nay, and later to Clelles in Grenoble. On 20 October 1940 she wrote a desperate letter to her friend Maria My, from Préchacq-Navarrenx (Pyrénées-Atlantiques), and asked for a food parcel. She had miraculously found her partner Gert Heinrich Wollheim in this Pyrenees village after months of internment. Following the withdrawal of Italian troops from the French Riviera, she went to Nice in 1944, where she was found hiding on the Côte d'Azur and was picked up by the Gestapo, and according to a briefing note dated January 23, 1944, she was deported to Drancy internment camp near Paris. On 3 February 1944, the 67 convoy took her to Auschwitz, where on 6 February 1944 she was murdered in the gas chamber.

Portraits
Waldemar Flaig : . Tatjana Barbakoff oil painting from 1927 in the Franciscan Museum in Villingen-Schwenningen
Kasia from Szadurska : Tatjana Barbakoff. Pencil and chalk to 1929 in the Municipal Wessenberg Gallery Konstanz
Rudolf Heinisch : . Tatjana Barbakoff oil painting of 1929, private collection
Rudolf Heinisch : studies on the dancer Tatyana Barbakoff. Water color, pencil and chalk around 1928, private collection
Gert Heinrich Wollheim : Tatjana Barbakoff oil on wood portrait 1928 held in Israel Museum in Jerusalem

Literature
Günter Goebbels: Tatjana Barbakoff. A forgotten dancer in pictures and documents . Circle Kulturbahnhof Eller eV, Düsseldorf 2009
Anja Hellhammer: foreign-like as the Far East: Tanja Barbakoff. In: Amelie Soyka (Hg.): Dancing and dance and nothing but dance. 
Tatjana Barbakoff. Dancer and muse, with texts by Klara Drenker-Nagels, Hildegard Reinhardt, Günter Goebbels and Anja Hellhammer, club August Macke Haus Bonn, Bonn of 2003.
Hildegard Reinhardt. Tatjana Barbakoff. Dancer and muse, in: World Art, Issue 2 February 2003.

Legacy
In Paris, Julia Tardi-Markus, a co-dancer with Barbakoff, started the "Tatjana Barbakoff Prize" in 1986 to help to encourage young dancers.  Gert Heinrich Wollheim painted a portrait of in 1928 which still hangs in the Israel Museum in Jerusalem.

The Düsseldorf City Museum hosts an exposition to honor Tatjana Barbakoff.  It contains photographs, and some of her stage costumes, and many of her playbills.  Some of Barbakoff’s stage costumes were given by Gert Wollheim’s widow, Mona Loeb (1908–1997) to Düsseldorf City Museum.

References

1899 births
1944 deaths
People from Aizpute
People from Courland Governorate
German ballerinas
German people of Russian-Jewish descent
German people of Chinese descent
Latvian people of Chinese descent
Latvian people of Russian-Jewish descent
Jewish cabaret performers
People from the Russian Empire of Jewish descent
People from the Russian Empire of Chinese descent
German Jews who died in the Holocaust
People killed by gas chamber by Nazi Germany
German people who died in Auschwitz concentration camp
Jewish entertainers
Gurs internment camp survivors
20th-century German women
20th-century German ballet dancers